USRC Rush  was a revenue cutter named for Richard Rush, eighth Secretary of the Treasury. She was completed in November 1885. In January 1886, soon after commissioning, she was assigned to search for the whaler Amethyst, last seen in the Bering Sea the previous October.

Rush spent her entire career on the Pacific ranging from the Bering Sea to Hawaii and San Diego, California performing customs duties, search and rescue, and law enforcement, including hosting judicial functions in furtherance of her enforcement of revenue and conservation laws. During the Spanish–American War in 1898 she was detached for duty with the United States Navy in the defense of the west coast, but returned to her duties with the Revenue Service later that year.

In 1899 she towed the newly commissioned river cutter  to Alaska. She was decommissioned on 30 September 1912 and sold on 22 January 1913 to the Alaska Junk Company for $8,500.

References

Sources
 Canney, Donald L. (1885), U.S. Coast Guard and Revenue Cutters, 1790–1935, Naval Institute Press

External links
 Teacher's Resource for U.S. Coast Guard History pp. 20–21

Ships of the United States Revenue Cutter Service
1885 ships